Brian O'Driscoll is an Irish international rugby union player who retired at the end of the 2013–14 season. He is a former captain of Ireland and also captained the British & Irish Lions. O'Driscoll, who spent the majority of his career playing at centre, made 133 appearances for Ireland, scoring 46 tries—an Irish record. In addition to this he made eight appearances for the Lions and scored one try, which occurred during the Lions' victory over Australia on the 2001 tour. , and with a combined total of 47 international tries, O'Driscoll sits eighth on the all-time record list, and is also top of the all-time try-scoring list for the Six Nations with 26. In addition, he retired with 141 caps in all, which at that time was the most in the sport's history (this record has since been surpassed by Richie McCaw of New Zealand [148 caps], Sergio Parisse of Italy [142] and Alun Wyn Jones of Wales [also 142]).

O'Driscoll made his international debut on 12 June 1999 against Australia at the Ballymore Stadium in Brisbane. He scored his first try for Ireland during his fourth match, against the United States in the 1999 Rugby World Cup at Lansdowne Road. It was the first of 19 tries O'Driscoll scored there (including 2 after the venue was redeveloped as the Aviva Stadium)  which, is a record.  O'Driscoll went on to score tries in the 2003, 2007 and 2011 Rugby World Cup tournaments.  His 33rd international try earned him the IRPA Try of the Year award in 2008 for a team try scored during Ireland's 18–12 defeat against Australia.  Starting from a lineout inside their own 22, Ireland caught their own kick as they moved up to the halfway line.  An exchange of passes culminated with O'Driscoll receiving the ball  out before scoring.

O'Driscoll scored multiple tries in a single international on six occasions, included in these were two hat-tricks. The first of these was scored against France during the 2000 Six Nations and the second came against Scotland in the 2002 Six Nations. O'Driscoll, who scored tries against all of the "Tier 1" nations, was most prolific against France, scoring eight times.

Key

 Won denotes that the match was won by the side O'Driscoll was playing for.
 Lost denotes that the match was lost by the side O'Driscoll was playing for.
 Drawn denotes that the match was drawn.
 * denotes the try was scored while playing for the British & Irish Lions.
 denotes the try was selected as the IRPA Try of the Year.

International tries

References

External links
O'Driscoll's tries at Statsguru
Brian O'Driscoll's best tries: 1999–2009

O
International tries by ODriscoll
International tries by O'Driscoll